The Randfontein mine is a large mine located in the northern part of South Africa in Gauteng. Randfontein represents one of the largest uranium reserves in South Africa having estimated reserves of 131.2 million tonnes of ore grading 0.066% uranium.

References 

Uranium mines in South Africa
Economy of Gauteng
Rand West City Local Municipality